The House of Schönborn  is the name of an ancient noble and mediatised formerly sovereign family of the former Holy Roman Empire.

Various members of the family have held high offices of the Roman Catholic Church and the Holy Roman Empire over the course of centuries, including as bishops, prince bishops, cardinals and prince-electors. In addition to several family members having been elected rulers of ecclesiastical principalities — the Electorate of Mainz, the Princely-Bishopric of Würzburg, the Princely-Bishopric of Worms, the Princely-Bishopric of Speyer, the Electorate of Trier, and the Princely-Bishoprice of Bamberg — the family possessed a fief in Franconia that held imperial immediacy as a county within the Holy Roman Empire, the state of Schönborn.

The House of Schönborn, especially its ruling prelates of the Roman Catholic Church, were among the most important builders of Southern German baroque architecture. The family gave the name Schönbornzeit (Age of the Schönborns) to an era (1642–1756), sometimes nostalgically remembered in the popular consciousness as an era of prosperity. Today, the term Schönbornzeit denotes a particular style of Rhenish and Franconian baroque.

History

Early History 
The Schönborn family first appeared in the Rheingau region with H. von Sconenburne in 1275. Their original seat was Schönborn in the County of Katzenelnbogen. A secondary source of 1670 mentions an earlier Eucharius von Schönborn of the mid 12th century, however without documentary proof. The lion in their coat of arms may derive from the Katzenelnbogen as well as from the nearby Diez counts whose vassals they were. By the end of the 14th century, the family had split into three branches one of which extinguished soon. The elder branch resided at Schönborn and held the office of Burgmann at Burgschwalbach, a castle built between 1354 and 1371 by count Eberhard V. of Katzenelnbogen. Gilbrecht of Schönborn was mentioned there in 1373. They were also Burgmanns at Hahnstätten in the County of Nassau. Several of them became abbots, one a grand bailiff of the Knights Hospitaller. The younger branch were vassals in the Westerwald region, in the service of the Barony of Westerburg, the Electorate of Trier, the Electorate of Mainz and the county of Wied. In the 16th century many younger sons of the family became Domherren (canons), leading to the extinction of both branches, with the exception of a side line of the younger branch that had received the fiefs of Freienfels (near Weinbach) and Eschbach (near Weilmünster).

Later history 

Johann Philipp von Schönborn of Eschbach, son of a minor nobleman in the employ of the then Lutheran counts of Wied, became a Catholic priest in the impoverished times of the Thirty Years' War. He was admitted as a minor canon by the cathedral chapter of Wurzburg. At the time, the family consisted only of his brother and himself. These two brought the family to power and fame, founding new branches that were to become widely known throughout Europe. Johann Philipp became a priest at Wurzburg Cathedral at the age of 16, changed to Mainz Cathedral in 1625 and to Worms Cathedral in 1630. He became a provost and, in 1642, was elected prince-bishop of Wurzburg. His diplomatic skills made him an important mediator during the Peace of Westphalia negotiations that ended the Thirty Years' War in 1648. As a result, he was additionally elected Archbishop of Mainz in 1647, thus also ruler of the Electorate of Mainz and archchancellor of the Holy Roman empire. In 1663 he also received the princely-bishopric of Worms. He was an effective administrator of his principalities and was able to bring back economic recovery. He fortified the city of Mainz and founded hospitals and high schools. His court was a center of German politics in the post-war era. Johann Philipp was the first of six members of the Schönborn family who, in the course of more than three generations, were to rule over eight of the most prestigious ecclesiastical principalities of the Holy Roman Empire.

He made his brother Philip Erwein (1607–1668) a Vogt in the Electorate of Mainz where the latter acquired the castles of Gaibach in 1650, of Geisenheim in 1654 and of Heusenstamm (where he built a new castle) in 1661. In 1635 he married Maria Ursula von Greiffenclau-Vollraths, a close relative of the late archbishop and elector of Mainz Georg Friedrich von Greiffenklau; the couple had 12 children. In 1663 Philip Erwein became a baron. The family thus shifted its focus from its regions of origin, which had become predominantly Protestant, to the Catholic ecclesiastical principalities of the empire.

Philip Erwein's son, Lothar Franz von Schönborn, also became a prince-bishop of Wurzburg in 1693 and an elector-archbishop of Mainz in 1695. The latter's brother Melchior (1644–1717) acquired the fief of Reichelsburg (near Aub) from the prince-bishop of Wurzburg in 1671, giving him access to the Franconian Circle of the imperial knights.

In 1701, Melchior's son, Rudolf Franz (1677–1754), married Eleonore von Hatzfeld, widow of the Count von Dernbach, who had left her the Herrschaft Wiesentheid in Franconia, a small imperial state raised to a county in 1701. Thus, the family obtained imperial immediacy for the first time, and since the counts of Schönborn bear the prefix Illustrious Highness. She had also inherited the Austrian fiefs of Arnfels and Waldenstein in Carinthia from her first husband. Melchior then bought some further estates in Austria in 1710, Göllersdorf with Mühlberg and Aspersdorf in Lower Austria, from the Counts of Buchheim. In 1717, his estate was partitioned into the states of Schönborn-Wiesentheid and Schönborn-Heusenstamm, both retaining immediacy. Heusenstamm was inherited by Schönborn-Wiesentheid in 1801. The state of Schönborn-Wiesentheid was mediatised in 1806.

In 1726, Charles VI, Holy Roman Emperor, granted Palanok Castle with Mukacheve, Chynadiyovo and 200 villages in the Kingdom of Hungary (today part of the Ukraine), to Elector Lothar Franz, after the latter had sent him troops to defeat Francis II Rákóczi, whose property it had been. The estate, one of the largest in Eastern Europe, remained in the family well into the 20th century.

In the year 1743, members of the family ruled the following states, all sovereign princely-bishoprics within the Holy Roman Empire: Bamberg, Würzburg, Konstanz, Speyer, Worms and Trier, while the archdiocese and electorate of Mainz (and thus archchancellorship of Germany, a position that two Schönborns had held shortly before) were held by a close relative, Johann Friedrich Karl von Ostein. Not only were important parts of Southern Germany under their control, but also quite wealthy regions. The Schönborns were not restricted to ruling these territories. They followed through, over several generations, with one of the most ambitious building programs of the 18th century, including churches, monasteries, ecclesiastical residences, schools and hospitals. Again, in the 19th and 20th/21st centuries, two Schönborns rose to become archbishops and cardinals. Given that the family had started under modest conditions with Johann Philipp in the early 17th century, this success was the result of piety, loyalty to the Catholic church and its strongest supporter in Europe, the House of Habsburg, ambition, diligence, organizational skills, grandiosity in planning, solid finances, advantageous marriages and overall, an iron will in pursuit of their goals through centuries. The House of Schönborn, initially rather impoverished knights, thus managed to surpass many of the more powerful older dynasties and to leave an enormous cultural legacy.

At the end of the 18th century, three brothers, who were great-grandsons of Rudolf Franz (1677–1754), established the three extant branches of the family:
 Franz Philipp (1768–1841) founded the Austrian branch, Schönborn-Buchheim, until today owning the Göllersdorf and Weyerburg estates and Palais Schönborn-Batthyány in Vienna;
 Franz Erwein (1776–1840) founded the Franconian branch (in Bavaria), Schönborn-Wiesentheid, until today owning the castles at Wiesentheid, Pommersfelden, Gaibach, Geisenheim and the wine estates Hallburg near Volkach and Hattenheim, and formerly also owning property in Bohemia; and 
 Friedrich (1781–1849) founded the Bohemian branch, Schönborn, residing at Schönborn Palace (Prague), today the U.S. embassy, and until 1945 at Skalka Castle, Czech Republic.

Rulers of Schönborn

Lords of Schönborn (1385–1663) 
 Gerard (1385–1416)
 Gerard (1416–1460)
 John II (1460–1490)
 John IV (1490–1529)
 George II (1529–1560)
 Philip (1560–1589)
 George IV (1589–1613)
 Philip Erwin (1613–1668), since 1663 Baron

Barons of Schönborn (1663–1701) 
Philip Erwin (1663–1668)
John Erwin (1668–1705), since 1701 Count, jointly with:

Counts of Schönborn (1701–1717) 
 John Erwin (1701–1705)
 Melchior Frederick (1705–1717)
Divided between the lines Heusenstamm and Wiesentheid.

After German Mediatisation 

  Hugo, Count 1772–1817 (1739–1817)
 Franz Philipp, Count of Schönborn-Buchheim (1768–1841)
  Schönborn-Buchheim Line
 Franz Erwein, Count of Schönborn-Wiesentheid (1776–1840)
  Schönborn-Wiesentheid Line
  Friedrich, Count 1817–1849 (1781–1849) Bohemian Line
  Erwein, Count 1849–1881 (1812–1881) 
 Karl, Count 1881–1908 (1840–1908)
 Johann, Count 1908–1912 (1864–1912)
 Karl Johann, Count 1912–1952 (1890–1952)
  Hugo-Damian, Count 1952–1979 (1916–1979)
 Philipp, Count 1979–present (born 1943)
 Count Christoph, Archbishop of Vienna and cardinal (born 1945) 
  Count Michael (born 1954)
  Count Heinrich (1910–1991)
  Count Alexander (born 1938)
  Count Damian (born 1987)
  Count Zdenko (1879–1960)
  Count Zdenko (1917–1993) – male heirs exist
  Franziskus von Paula (1844–1899) was a Czech Roman Catholic bishop of České Budějovice and later archbishop of Prague and cardinal.

Counts of Schönborn-Buchheim 
 Francis George (1682–1756)

After German Mediatisation 

  Franz, 1st Count 1817–1841 (1768–1841)
 Erwein, 2nd Count 1841–1844 (1791–1864) – resigned rights to his brother in 1844
  Karl, 3rd Count 1844–1854 (1803–1854)
  Erwein, 4th Count 1854–1903 (1842–1903)
  Friedrich Karl, 5th Count 1903–1932 (1869–1932)
  Georg 6th Count 1932–1989 (1906–1989) 
  Friedrich Karl, 7th Count 1989–present (born 1938) ∞ Isabelle d'Orleans, Princess of France
 Damian, Hereditary Count of Schönborn-Buchheim (born 1965)
 Count Vinzenz (born 1966)
 Count Philipp (born 2003)
 Count Clemens (born 2005)
  Count Alexander (born 2010)
  Count Melchior (born 1977)
  Count Theodor (born 2015)

Counts of Schönborn-Heusenstamm (1717–1801) 

Schönborn-Heusenstamm was a German statelet ruled by the Schönborn family located in the south of modern Hesse, Germany. Schönborn-Heusenstamm was a partition of Schönborn, and was inherited by Schönborn-Wiesentheid in 1801.
 Anselm Francis (1717–1726)
 Anselm Posthumous (1726–1801)

Counts of Schönborn-Wiesentheid (1717–1806) 

Schönborn-Wiesentheid was a County in Lower Franconia, the northwestern Region of modern Bavaria, Germany, comprising various isolated districts spanning from the Regnitz River to the Main River east of Würzburg. Schönborn-Wiesentheid was a partition of Schönborn, and inherited the other line of Schönborn-Heusenstamm in 1801. Schönborn-Wiesentheid was mediatised to Bavaria in 1806. 
 Rudolph Francis Erwin (1717–1754)
 Joseph Francis Bonaventura (1754–1772)
 Damian Hugo Erwin (1772–1806)

After German Mediatisation 

  Franz, 1st Count 18..-1840 (1776–1840)
 Hugo, 2nd Count 1840–1865 (1805–1865)
  Klemens, 3rd Count 1865–1877 (1810–1877)
  Arthur, 4th Count 1877–1915 (1846–1915)
  Erwein, 5th Count 1915–1942 (1877–1942)
  Karl, 6th Count 1942–1998 (1916–1998)
 Filipp, 7th Count 1998–2004 (born 1954) – renounced his title in 2004
  Paul, 8th Count 1998–present (born 1964)
 Franz, Hereditary Count of Schönborn-Wiesentheid (born 1990)
 Count Alexander (born 1991)
 Count Johannes (born 1991)
 Count Georg (born 1995)
  Count Michael (born 1997)

Prelates of the family 

This family counts several prelates of the Roman Catholic Church: 
 Johann Philipp von Schönborn (1605–1673), Prince-elector and Archbishop of Mainz, Bishop of Würzburg and Worms. His contemporaries gave him the honourable titles of "the Wise", "the German Solomon", and "the Cato of Germany".
 Lothar Franz von Schönborn, nephew of the above, was Prince-elector and Archbishop of Mainz (1695–1729) and Bishop of Bamberg (1693).
 Damian Hugo Philipp von Schönborn, Prince-Bishop of Speyer (1719–1743) and of Konstanz (1740), and was also a cardinal. He did much for the Diocese of Speyer, and was conspicuous for his culture, learning, and piety.
 Franz Georg von Schönborn, Prince-elector and Archbishop of Trier (1729–1756) and Bishop of Worms (1732). Both Frederick the Great and Maria Theresa praised him as an excellent ruler.
 Johann Philipp Franz von Schönborn, Bishop of Würzburg (1719–1724).
 Friedrich Karl von Schönborn (3 March 1674 – 26 July 1746) was Bishop of Bamberg and Würzburg (1729–1746). He was born at Mainz. He spent most of his time at the Imperial court in Vienna, serving as Vice-Chancellor of the Holy Roman Empire from 1705 to 1734. The last three prelates were brothers, and nephews of Lothar Franz.
 Franziskus von Paula Graf von Schönborn. (24 January 1844 – 6 June 1899). Born in Prague, he became Archbishop of Prague in 1885, and was created cardinal in 1889.
 Christoph Cardinal Schönborn (b. 1945) is the  Archbishop of Vienna.

Baroque architecture 

The House of Schönborn, especially its ruling prelates of the Roman Catholic Church, were among the most important builders of Southern German baroque architecture. While the private estates, at a large part still today owned by the family, were of more modest size, sometimes of elder origin, churches, monasteries, ecclesiastical residences and hospitals built by the Schönborn bishops were of immense grandness and splendor. Financing these was only possible with flourishing economies, which the Schönborn bishops did their best to uphold and enhance. Their famous court architect Balthasar Neumann was responsible for many of these buildings, others were Johann Dientzenhofer, Maximilian von Welsch and Johann Lukas von Hildebrandt. The family gave the name Schönbornzeit (Age of the Schönborns) to an era (1642–1756), sometimes nostalgically remembered in the popular conscience as an era of prosperity. Today, the term Schönbornzeit denotes a particular style of Rhenish and Franconian baroque.

The ecclesiastical residences were owned by the church, and continued to be inhabited by successive bishops, while the private estates remained inheritance of the family. They were mostly acquired by the ruling prelates' brothers. Of the grand bishops' palaces, only Weissenstein Palace at Pommersfelden continues to be privately owned by the family, as it was built, from 1711, with an initial amount of 100.000 guilders which were personally granted to elector Lothar Franz by Charles VI, Holy Roman Emperor, in reward of his services and his continuous political support. It contains the largest private baroque art collection in Germany.

Private residences 
 Burg Schönborn (built around 1100)
 Burgschwalbach castle (a fief of the County of Katzenelnbogen, administrated in the Middle Ages by the Lords of Schönborn)
 Freienfels castle near Weinbach, 1466–1687 owned by the family
 Schloss Gaibach (near Volkach), since 1650 to this day owned by the Counts of Schönborn-Wiesentheid
 Schloss Geisenheim, since 1652 to this day owned by the Counts of Schönborn-Wiesentheid
 Schloss Heusenstamm (built from 1661)
 Schönborner Hof in Mainz (built from 1668) 
 Schönborner Hof in Aschaffenburg (built from 1673) 
 Schloss Wiesentheid, from 1701 to this day owned by the Counts of Schönborn-Wiesentheid and serving as their private residence

 Weissenstein Palace at Pommersfelden (built from 1711–18 for Lothar Franz von Schönborn), still owned by the Counts of Schönborn-Wiesentheid. The palace which is open to the public contains the largest private Baroque art collection in Germany, containing over 600 pictures. Baroque and Renaissance artists represented include Peter Paul Rubens, Albrecht Dürer, Titian, Rembrandt, Anthony van Dyck and Artemisia Gentileschi. It also houses a collection of 17th–19th century musical manuscripts and prints, the "Musical Collection of the Counts Schönborn-Wiesentheid", mainly acquired by Count Rudolf Franz Erwein von Schönborn (1677–1754), a talented amateur cellist who had ordered original cello compositions from various composers including Platti and Vivaldi. This is called the "elder repertoire" and consists of 147 prints and 497 mss. Its contents are listed with RISM. The "younger repertoire" was acquired by the cellists grandson resp. grand-grandson, Hugo Damian Erwein (1738–1817) and Franz Erwein von Schönborn (1774–1840). It consists of 141 prints and 98 mss. The whole library has been microfilmed 

 Göllersdorf estate, Austria (since 1710 owned by the Counts of Schönborn-Buchheim)
 Weyerburg castle, Austria (since 1714 owned by the Counts of Schönborn-Buchheim)
 Palais Schönborn-Batthyány, Vienna (since 1740 owned by the Counts of Schönborn-Buchheim)
 Palais Schönborn, Laudongasse, Vienna
 Schönborn Palace (Prague), sold by the Bohemian branch in 1919, since then embassy of the United States
 Skalka Castle near Vlastislav (Litoměřice District), Czech Republic, owned by the Bohemian branch until expropriation by the communists in 1946 (place of birth of Christoph Cardinal Schönborn)
 Chynadiyovo Castle, Ukraine

Churches 
More than 100 churches were built during the rule of Schönborn bishops, many of them by their famous court architect Balthasar Neumann, among them:
 Würzburg Residence court chapel
 Basilica of the Fourteen Holy Helpers
 Court chapel of Meersburg Residence 
 Pilgrimage church of the Holy Trinity at Gößweinstein
 St Mauritius (Wiesentheid)
 St Cäcilia (Heusenstamm)
 Basilica of St. Paulinus, Trier
 St Laurence at Dirmstein
 St. Peter at Bruchsal
 Prüm Abbey, new buildings from 1748

Ecclesiastical and official residences 
Fortress of Mainz and Mainz Citadel (built between 1655 and 1675 for Johann Philipp) 
New Residence in Bamberg (built from 1697 for Lothar Franz)
Favorite Palace in Mainz (built from 1700 for Lothar Franz)
The Federal Chancellery of Austria, built 1717–1719 for Vice-Chancellor Friedrich Karl von Schönborn
Blauer Hof Laxenburg (1710–1720 for Friedrich Karl)
Würzburg Residence (built from 1719 for Johann Philipp Franz von Schönborn, accomplished under Friedrich Karl) 
Bruchsal Palace (built from 1720 for Damian Hugo)
Imperial Chancellory Wing of the Hofburg Palace in Vienna (1723–30 under Vice-Chancellor Friedrich Karl von Schönborn)
Schloss Werneck (built from 1733 for Friedrich Karl)
Schloss Philippsburg (Dicasterial Building), Koblenz (1738–1749 for Franz Georg)
Neues Schloss (Meersburg), completion of the palace (from 1740 for Damian Hugo)
Schloss Schönbornslust at Koblenz-Kesselheim (1748–1752 for Franz Georg)

Gallery

See also 
 Anna Sophia van Schönborn
 Franziskus von Paula Graf von Schönborn
 Gregor Graf von Schönborn-Wiesentheid

Notes

External links 

 Official website of the Count of Schönborn (Franconian branch of Schönborn-Wiesentheid)
 Genealogy from 1284
 History of the County of Katzenelnbogen and the First Riesling of the World

 
Priestly families